The following are the events in professional sumo during 2001.

Tournaments
Hatsu basho, Ryogoku Kokugikan, Tokyo, 7 January – 21 January
Haru basho, Osaka Prefectural Gymnasium, Osaka, 11 March – 25 March
Natsu basho, Ryogoku Kokugikan, Tokyo, 13 May – 27 May
Nagoya basho, Aichi Prefectural Gymnasium, Nagoya, 8 July – 22 July
Aki basho, Ryogoku Kokugikan, Tokyo, 9 September – 23 September
Kyushu basho, Fukuoka International Centre, Kyushu, 11 November – 25 November

News

January
21: Yokozuna Takanohana wins his first yusho in over two years, defeating fellow yokozuna Musashimaru in a playoff after both men finish on 14–1. Tochinonada wins the Technique Award. Wakanoyama scores 9–6 from maegashira 3, his best ever result, and wins the Fighting Spirit Prize. Wakanosato receives the Outstanding Performance Award for his win over Musashimaru. Tamanonada wins the juryo championship and promotion back to the top makuuchi division, and changes his name to Tamanoshima. Maegashira Toki is suspended from the tournament for being involved in a traffic accident in December, and drops to juryo. As a result, the Takasago stable is without any makuuchi wrestlers for the first time in its history.
22: Yokozuna Akebono, who won his 11th championship in the previous tournament in November but was  absent through injury from this one, announces his retirement, due to the constant pain in both his knees. He will stay in sumo as a coach at his Azumazeki stable, under the elder name Akebono Oyakata.
29: The Japan Sumo Association award Akebono a bonus of 100 million yen for his services to sumo, tying the record amount awarded to Chiyonofuji upon his retirement in 1991.

February

March

25: Ozeki Kaio wins his second championship. He finishes on 13–2, one win ahead of Takanohana, Musashimaru and fellow ozeki Musoyama. Maegashira Tamanoshima gets the Fighting Spirit Award for his eleven wins. Kotomitsuki receives his second Technique prize, while Tochinonada and Tochiazuma share the Outstanding Performance Prize. Wakatsutomu wins the juryo championship with just a 10–5 score, after a playoff with Toki. Former maegashira Daihisho retires.

May
22: Takanohana wins his 22nd yusho in dramatic fashion, beating Musashimaru in a playoff despite clearly suffering from serious knee ligament damage sustained in a defeat to Musoyama the previous day. Kaio pulls out with back pain after losing four bouts in the first eight days. Kotomitsuki receives the Technique Award while fellow komusubi Asashoryu gets the Outstanding Performance Prize in his first tournament at the rank. Kitazakura wins his first juryo yusho. Former maegashira Shikishima retires.

June
5: Futagoyama Oyakata announces that his son Takanohana will not take part in the next tournament, and indicates that he will require a lengthy layoff.

July
22: Kaio wins his second championship of the year with a 13–2 record despite limited training due to his ongoing back trouble. Musashimaru is runner up on 12–3 alongside Tamanoshima who gets another Fighting Spirit Award. The Technique Prize is shared between Tochiazuma and Tokitsuumi while Wakanosato receives the Outstanding Performance Prize. Dejima is demoted from the ozeki rank. Buyuzan wins the juryo championship, coming through a series of playoffs after a record eight men (Buyuzan, Terao, Oikari, Tamarikido, Takatoriki, Sentoryu, Hamanishiki and Wakatoba) all finish on the same score, just 9–6.
23: It is revealed that Takanohana has travelled to Paris to have his injured knee operated on by a specialist.

September

23: Maegashira 2 Kotomitsuki wins his first championship with a 13–2 record, and takes all three special prizes. Sekiwake Tochiazuma is runner-up on 12–3. Kaiho also receives a share of the Technique Prize, while Asashoryu gets a share of the Fighting Spirit prize. Takanohana is still recuperating from his surgery, and Kaio, Chiyotaikai and Miyabiyama all drop out early through injury. Miyabiyama joins his stablemate Dejima in being demoted from ozeki. Musashimaru finishes with a mediocre 9–6. Former maegashira Aogiyama wins the juryo yusho.
29: Akebono's retirement ceremony or danpatsu-shiki takes place at the Kokugikan. Guests taking part in the hair-cutting ritual include US Ambassador to Japan Howard Baker, an ambassador representing the French President (and sumo fan) Jacques Chirac, Konishiki, Takanohana and finally Akebono's stablemaster Azumazeki Oyakata.

November
25: Musashimaru wins his first yusho since September 2000 with a 13–2 score. Tochiazuma is once again runner-up on 12–3 and seals his promotion to ozeki. He also receives his seventh Technique Prize. Takanohana, Chiyotaikai and Miyabiyama sit out, but Kaio returns to score 10–5. Asashoryu and Wakanosato share the Fighting Spirit Prize with top division debutant Buyuzan. Oikari wins the juryo championship. Former komusubi Tomonohana retires.
28: Tochiazuma's promotion to ozeki is officially confirmed. He becomes the fifth son of a former wrestler to make the ozeki rank.

Deaths
17 January: former komusubi Wakabayama, also former Shikoroyama Oyakata, aged 78, of cerebral thrombosis. 
27 January: Onogawa Oyakata, former maegashira Hachiya, aged 50, of mouth cancer.

See also
Glossary of sumo terms
List of past sumo wrestlers
List of years in sumo
List of yokozuna

References

Sumo by year
Sumo